Cubanate are an English industrial band from London, England, founded in 1992 by Marc Heal and Graham Rayner with Phil Barry and Steve Etheridge. The group became well known for their combination of electro-industrial with distorted heavy metal guitars and techno percussion (later incorporating breakbeats).

History
Cubanate played their first UK tour in November 1992 supporting leftfield UK techno duo Sheep on Drugs. The group signed to Berlin's Dynamica Records shortly afterwards. Rayner and Etheridge departed after the first Machinery single, "Body Burn" (1993). The pair were replaced by Julian Beeston (ex – Nitzer Ebb drummer).

In May 1994, the Metal EP was Single of the Week in Melody Maker magazine and later that year Cubanate received media attention when they were weirdly paired with Carcass for what turned out to be a notoriously violent UK tour ending in death threats to Heal and an on-air confrontation on the Radio One Rock Show with Bruce Dickinson.

The second album Cyberia (1995) spawned the hit single "Oxyacetylene", generally considered Cubanate's creative peak.  The album peaked at  3 on the CMJ RPM Chart in the U.S. For live work around the Cyberia tour the band hired Shep Ashton on guitar and Darren Bennett on keyboards. After 1996, Ashton and Bennett were replaced by Roddy Stone (currently fronting UK metal act Viking Skull) and David Bianchi (who later went on to become manager of rock bands The Enemy and Boy Kill Boy).

The third album, Barbarossa (1996) continued the crossover format, and despite being name-checked as influences by bands such as The Prodigy, the group decided a change was clearly needed.

Signed in the United States to Wax Trax! Recordings for the act's fourth and final official full-length album to date, Interference (1998) was a departure from Cubanate's earlier techno experiments with a strong drum and bass influence that alienated some of their traditionalist fans but was heralded as revelatory by others. The album was co-produced by Rhys Fulber.

Early 2000s hiatus

In 2004, a torrent appeared on the Internet with nine leaked demo tracks recorded by Heal in 2000 titled Search Engine.  Featuring such tracks as "Razor Edge", "Superstructure", and "Drowning Hands" the material had been abandoned by Heal in 2000.

In October 2010, the band announced that they were recording again and would be releasing new material in 2011. A new track titled "We Are Crowd" was released on Alfa-Matrix's compilation EBM1.

In a posting on his Facebook page dated 13 September 2011, Cubanate founder Marc Heal stated: "Marc here. I should have posted this a while back, but I wanted to let everyone know that I have decided conclusively not to do another Cubanate album. It was a real blast getting back into studio with Phil – and he came up with some brilliant music. But I'm doing something different with my life now and I've come to the conclusion to leave it. Thanks for all your support, I really appreciate it. I'll keep posting. M".

Both Heal and Barry have released solo work since that announcement.

Reunion
On 24 September 2016, Cubanate reformed to play the Cold Waves Festival (an annual industrial music festival held in Chicago, Illinois, United States) with members Marc Heal, Phil Barry and Vince McAley (variously from Dead on TV, GoFight and Die Warzau). The festival lineup included The Cocks (ex-Revolting Cocks members: Richard 23, Luc van Acker, Chris Connelly & Paul Barker), <PIG>, 16Volt, Dead When I Found Her, Bloody Knives, and Kanga, many of whom had previously collaborated with Heal in projects such as Pigface and C-Tec.

On 5 May 2017, Cubanate released a compilation album titled Brutalism via Armalyte Industries, featuring 14 remastered songs from Cubanate's first three albums.

On 8 May 2019, Cubanate announced the upcoming release of Kolossus, their first new material since 1998. Kolossus was released on 7 June 2019.

Musical style

Cubanate has been described often as electro-industrial. AllMusic wrote that the band "have explored the hybrid style created by mixing industrial music with the high-speed rhythms of techno". The band also has included elements of industrial metal in some songs, with vocals similar to the vocals of Lemmy Kilmister of heavy metal band Motörhead.

Discography

Albums and EPs

Singles

Legacy and influence
Although the act is not very well known outside the crossover scene, Cubanate had a brief vogue in heavy metal circles. The band toured with acts such as Fear Factory, The Sisters of Mercy, Rammstein, Carcass and other rock acts, whilst "Body Burn" and "Oxyacetylene"' were both 'Single of the Week' in the British rock weekly Kerrang! magazine and a number of early nu metal acts have cited Cubanate as an influence.

"Oxyacetylene" was featured on the 1996 compilation album, Mortal Kombat: More Kombat, and was later used on the soundtrack of the best-selling 1998 PlayStation game Gran Turismo in the NTSC and EU versions. Apart from "Oxyacetylene", three other Cubanate songs were used on Gran Turismo and the single "Body Burn" can be heard at length in episode eighty two of The Sopranos, from the final season of the show.

References

External links

 artist information/discography page at CyberNoise
 Cubanate biography at The Syndicate

TVT Records artists
Electronic music duos
Musical groups established in 1992
Musical groups from London
British industrial music groups
Electro-industrial music groups
Wax Trax! Records artists
English techno music groups
British industrial rock musical groups
British industrial metal musical groups
Rock music duos